Somarapu Satyanarayana is an Indian politician and former Member of Legislative Assembly in Telangana.

Early life
Somarapu Satyanarayana was born in Manthani, Karimnagar district (Present in Peddapalli district), Telangana, India.

Career
He is District President for Peddapalli BJP and he was elected independently to Ramagundam constituency in erstwhile Karimnagar district in Telangana. He supported Congress party but withdrew his support and joined Telangana Rashtra Samithi on 30 October 2011. After losing 2018 Assembly elections he resigned from TRS party and joined BJP.

References

Telugu politicians
Telangana politicians
Telangana Rashtra Samithi politicians
Living people
1948 births
People from Karimnagar district
People from Ramagundam